The Voice Project is an open-access singing project, based in Norwich, England. It is a Registered Charity and a Limited Company. It was created by singers Siân Croose and Jonathan Baker in 2008. 

It has held performances of new vocal music and workshops designed to build vocal confidence and explore vocal music.

In 2018, it established a choir in Brighton and has run three projects with performances in Sussex.

Concept
Music is taught by ear, and the project does not require the singers to be able to read music. Scores and sound files are provided to support individual learning, outside of rehearsals. Typically, two performances are given each year, one in the late Spring/early Summer, the other in December or January. Performances are often site-specific, making use of all the space available to tell a story.

Siân Croose is a singer, conductor and performance maker with over 30 years experience creating and directing music projects in the UK. After an apprenticeship in bands and alternative theatre, she trained on the Community Music programme founded by John Stevens. She has run choirs, vocal ensembles, and workshops for singers since 1990, and performed with composer Helen Chadwick and a cappella ensemble Human Music in a wide range of UK festivals and performance projects. Composition projects include Harmonium, a wordless systems-based a cappella project for women's voices and The Dawn Chorus with American composer Brendan Taaffe. She runs Norwich – based choir Big Sky, regularly commissioning new music from award-winning songwriter Chris Wood and others, and performing with storyteller Hugh Lupton and multi-instrumentalist Adrian Lever.

Jon Baker is a singer, teacher and composer who has written extensively for TV, radio and theatre. He is a founder-member of The Neutrinos with whom he has toured throughout Europe and North America. He is a co-founder of The Voice Project and also a co-founder of KlangHaus.

Projects 
Since its inception, the Voice Project has often been commissioned to produce a show for performance at the Norfolk & Norwich Festival in May. In addition, there has often also been a winter project for a performance in December or January.

In Tsegihi 
Commissioned from Jon Hassell by Norfolk & Norwich Festival, and performed in Norwich Cathedral in May 2008. Music performed by Jon Hassell (Trumpet, Keyboard), Peter Freeman (Bass, Laptop), Jan Bang (live sampling) and Pete Lockett (Drums). Sound and Sound Design by Arnaud Mercier.

I Prefer the Gorgeous Freedom
Commissioned from Gwilym Simcock by Norfolk & Norwich Festival and Sage Gateshead, and performed in Norwich Cathedral (May 2009), Sage Gateshead, and Queen Elizabeth Hall in London. The London concert was broadcast by BBC Radio 3. Music performed by Gwilym Simcock (Piano), Yuri Goloubev (Bass), Klaus Gesing (Sax) and James Maddren (Drums). Solo singers were Sianed Jones (Soprano), Rebecca Askew (Alto), Jeremy Avis (Tenor) and Jonathan Baker (Bass). The Voice Project Choir was conducted by Siân Croose.

Winter Songs (2009) 
Norwich Catholic Cathedral December. Solo singers: Bex Mather & Sharon Durant (Soprano), Katherine Zeserson & Siân Croose (Alto), Dave Camlin & Jonathan Baker (Bass). The Voice Project Choir was conducted by Siân Croose.

Recording Angel 
Commissioned from Arve Henriksen and Jan Bang by Norfolk & Norwich Festival and performed in Norwich Cathedral in May 2010. Music performed by Arve Henriksen (Trumpet) and Jan Bang (live sampling). Solo singers were Sianed Jones (Soprano), Rebecca Askew (Alto), Jeremy Avis (Tenor) and Jonathan Baker (Bass). The Voice Project Choir was conducted by Siân Croose.

Winter Songs (2010) 
Norwich Catholic Cathedral December. Music performed by Lewis Wright (Vibraphone) and Adrian Lever (Piano). Solo singers: Sianed Jones & Helen Chadwick (Soprano), Katherine Zeserson & Siân Croose (Alto), Dave Camlin & Jonathan Baker (Bass). The Voice Project Choir was conducted by Siân Croose.

Glossolalia
Commissioned from Andy Sheppard by Norfolk & Norwich Festival and performed as part of Jazz Sous Les Pommiers in Coutances, Normandy, Northern France in 2010, and also at Sage Gateshead as part of Gateshead International Jazz Festival in March 2007.

Music performed by Andy Sheppard (Tenor and Soprano Saxophone), John Parricelli (Guitar), Kuljit Bamra (Tabla and Percussion). Solo singers were Sianed Jones (Soprano), Katherine Zeserson (Alto) and Jonathan Baker (Bass). The Coutances Choir with The Voice Project Choir were conducted by Siân Croose.

The Proportions of the Temple 
Commissioned from Nik Bärtsch by Norfolk & Norwich Festival and performed in Norwich Cathedral in May 2011. Music performed by Nik Bärtsch and Trio Zèphyr. Solo singers were Sianed Jones (Soprano), Rebecca Askew (Alto), Jeremy Avis (Tenor) and Jonathan Baker (Bass). The Voice Project Choir was conducted by Siân Croose.

Winter Songs (2011) 
This piece was performed in Norwich (Catholic) Cathedral in December 2011.

Music performed by Adrian Lever (Piano). The Voice Project Quintet were Sianed Jones & Helen Chadwick (Soprano), Katherine Zeserson & Siân Croose (Alto) and Dave Camlin & Jonathan Baker (Bass). The Voice Project Choir was conducted by Siân Croose.

Singing the City (From Dawn to Dusk) 
This piece was commissioned by Norfolk & Norwich Festival and performed in various locations around Norwich in May 2012.

Composed by Orlando Gough, Helen Chadwick, Jonathan Baker and Jeremy Avis. The Voice Project Quartet were Sianed Jones (Soprano), Rebecca Askew (Alto), Jeremy Avis (Tenor) and Jonathan Baker (Bass). The Voice Project Choir was conducted by Siân Croose.

City of Strangers 
This piece was performed in the Friends Meeting House, Norwich on 15 December 2012.

Composed by Karen Wimhurst, Jonathan Baker, Orlando Gough. The Voice Project Quintet were Sianed Jone] (Soprano); Rebecca Askew, Siân Croose, Katherine Zeserson (Alto); Dave Camlin & Jonathan Baker (Bass). The Voice Project Choir was conducted by Siân Croose.

Ideas of Flight
This piece was commissioned by Norfolk & Norwich Festival and performed in Norwich (Anglican) Cathedral on 11 May 2013 and at St. Benet's Abbey on 13 May 2013.

Music composed by Barbara Thompson, Orlando Gough, Karen Wimhurst and Jonathan Baker. Music performed by Andy Sheppard (Saxophone) and Trio Zephyr. The Voice Project Quintet were Sianed Jones (Soprano), Rebecca Askew and Siân Croose (Alto), Jeremy Avis (Tenor) and Jonathan Baker (Bass). 'The Birds of East London' was read by Stephen Watts. The Voice Project Choir was conducted by Siân Croose.

Nocturne 
This piece was performed in Norwich (Anglican) Cathedral on 14 December 2013.

Musicians: Derek Scurll (Percussion) and Adrian Lever (Chamber Organ). The Voice Project Quintet were Sharon Durant (Soprano), Katherine Zeserson & Siân Croose (Alto), Dave Camlin & Jonathan Baker (Bass). The Voice Project Choir was conducted by Siân Croose.

Souvenir
This piece was commissioned by Norfolk & Norwich Festival and performed on Holkham Hall estate on 17 May 2014.

Music composed by Orlando Gough, Helen Chadwick, Karen Wimhurst and Jonathan Baker. Music performed by Bold as Brass Quartet and Derek Scurll (Percussion). Solo singers were Sianed Jones (Soprano), Rebecca Askew (Alto), Jeremy Avis (Tenor) and Jonathan Baker (Bass). The Voice Project Choir was conducted by Siân Croose.

Lost and Found 
This piece was performed in Norwich City Hall on 6 December 2014.

Music composed by Orlando Gough, Helen Chadwick, Karen Wimhurst, Jonathan Baker and Dave Camlin, Music performed by Adrian Lever (Piano). Sound Design was by Bill Vine, Lighting Design by Tim Tracey, and Lighting by Pip Cotterell. Human Music were Sharon Durant (Soprano), Helen Chadwick (Soprano), Katherine Zeserson] (Alto), Siân Croose (Alto), Jeremy Avis (Tenor), Dave Camlin (Bass), Jonathan Baker (Bass). The Voice Project Choir was conducted by Siân Croose.

The Observatory 
The Observatory was a site-responsive piece presented as part of the Norfolk & Norwich Festival and created as part of a partnership with the Sainsbury Centre for Visual Arts (SCVA) and the University of East Anglia (UEA). The piece was an exploration of humankind's relationship with space - and our gradual attempts to understand and explore it with the poetic, the scientific and the musical. Weightlessness, distance, fear of the unknown, infinity and astronomical geometry inspired this piece which was staged in and around the SCVA. The SCVA provided a futuristic background for this piece which informed the design of the show – and also the opportunity for the audience to experience this iconic building quite differently. There was a choir of 200 and an audience of 750 across 3 shows.

Commissioned by Norfolk & Norwich Festival. Music composed by Orlando Gough, Karen Wimhurst, Siân Croose and Jonathan Baker. Performed at The Sainsbury Centre for Visual Arts on 9th/10th May 2015. Music performed by Joby Burgess (percussion), BJ Cole (pedal steel), Adrian Lever (keyboards), Steve Saunders & Lewis Edney (bass trombones). The Voice Project quintet were Sianed Jones (Soprano), Sharon Durant (Alto), Greg Tassell (Tenor) and Jonathan Baker (Bass). Lighting design was done by Tim Tracey. The Astronomy Choir was conducted by Siân Croose.

Norwich Over the Water (Singing the City) 
Norwich Over the Water was a promenade outdoor choral piece around the River Wensum and Norwich University of the Arts quad in Norwich's historic centre of the textile and dyeing industries. Taking place on a Saturday afternoon, the piece started at The Octagon Chapel and processed across bridges to a finale in the quad of Norwich University of the Arts. There was a choir of 110 and an estimated audience of 2,500.

Part of Vocal Invention 2016. The Voice Project Sextet were Bex Mather & Sharon Durant (Soprano), Katherine Zeserson & Siân Croose (Alto), Dave Camlin & Jonathan Baker (Bass). The Voice Project Choir was conducted by Siân Croose.

Red Shift
This piece was performed on 23 January 2016 in St. Andrews Hall, Norwich. It was the last show delivered as part of the 'Singing the City' programme, and it was a seated performance in a well-known Norwich building, which was used in an unusual way. It marked the turning of the year with choral music that took us from the dark of winter to the promise of spring, exploring the themes of dark and light, hibernation and awakening. This was the Project's most successful self-produced show to date, with two sold-out performances and the largest winter choir assembled.

Music composed by Karen Wimhurst, Siân Croose and Jonathan Baker. Music performed by Rowland Sutherland (flutes) and Donna-Maria Landowski (percussion). The Voice Project Quintet were Lisa Cassidy & Sharon Durant (Soprano), Siân Croose (Alto), Jeremy Avis (Tenor), Jonathan Baker (Bass). The Voice Project Choir was conducted by Siân Croose.

The Arms of Sleep
This co-commission between the Norfolk & Norwich Festival, the Brighton International Festival and the Voice Project was performed six times at the Assembly House in Norwich as part of the 2017 Norfolk & Norwich Festival (20 to 26 May 2017) and four times at Firle Place Riding School (nr. Lewes, Sussex) as part of the 2018 Brighton International Festival (10 to 13 May 2018). Taking the form of an overnight performance, forty audience members joined the choir, soloists and instrumentalists for a ten-hour piece during which time the audience slept, were read to, were woken up for a 2.30am ‘dream sequence’ performance and eventually woken again at 7am for breakfast and a final choral show. There was a choir of 105 and an audience of 240 for the six shows in Norwich.

Music composed by Orlando Gough, Jonathan Baker, Helen Chadwick & Jon Hopkins. The Voice Project Quintet were Sianed Jones & Lisa Cassidy (soprano), Siân Croose (Alto), Jeremy Avis (Tenor), Jonathan Baker (Bass). The Voice Project Choir was conducted by Siân Croose.

Between Stars
This site-responsive piece took place in Norwich Cathedral on 23 January 2017 – making extensive use of the space in a carefully choreographed promenade performance. The seating was removed from the nave to allow the performers to move freely throughout the space and to increase the effect of the lighting design. There was a choir of 150 and an estimated audience of 500 across two performances.

Music composed by Jonathan Baker, Orlando Gough, Helen Chadwick and Siân Croose. Music performed by Esther Hopkinson (Violin), Hefin Miles (Violin), John Mudd (Cello), Adrian Lever (Piano), Jeron Gundersen (Percussion). The Voice Project quintet were Lisa Cassidy (Soprano), Rebecca Askew & Siân Croose (Alto), Jeremy Avis (Tenor), Jonathan Baker (Bass). The Voice Project Choir was conducted by Siân Croose.

Travels in Light
This piece was performed on 20 January 2018 in three churches along Princes Street in Norwich - St. Georges near the junction with Tombland, St. Peter Hungate near the corner of Elm Hill, and the United Reformed Church opposite. It was the third part of the 'Arms of Sleep' trilogy of performances related to sleep, waking and dreaming - following on from Between Stars in January 2017 and The Arms of Sleep in May 2017.

Music composed by Jonathan Baker, Orlando Gough, Rebecca Askew, Siân Croose, Helen Chadwick, Karen Wimhurst. Music performed by Adrian Lever (piano, organ and hammered dulcimer). The Voice Project quintet were Sianed Jones & Lisa Cassidy (Soprano), Siân Croose (Alto), Jeremy Avis (Tenor), Jonathan Baker (Bass). Lighting design was done by Tim Tracey. The Voice Project Choir was conducted by Siân Croose.

Timepiece
Timepiece was an ambitious project, performed in the cloisters of Norwich Cathedral, involving performances on the hour every hour between midday and midnight on 25 May 2018. It involved four choirs (The Male Boys Choir, Big Sky, Harmonium, The Voice Project Choir), a professional quintet and instrumentalists. It was commissioned by Norfolk & Norwich Festival and was free to the general public.

Music composed by Orlando Gough, Jonathan Baker, Jason Dixon, Erin McDonnell, Siân Croose, Meredith Monk, Helen Chadwick & Jeremy Avis. Music performed by Chris Dowding (Trumpet and Flugelhorn) and Derek Scurll (Percussion). The Voice Project Quintet were Lisa Cassidy (Soprano), Sharon Dunant (Soprano), Siân Croose (Alto), Jeremy Avis (Tenor) and Jon Baker (Bass). The Voice Project Choir was conducted by Siân Croose.

The Sky is Full of Light
This piece was performed on 22 December 2018 in St. Andrews Hall, Norwich. It was a celebration of the Voice Project's 10th Birthday, and 15 years since its first new commission (Barbara Thompson's "Journey to a Destination Unknown"). The programme included highlights from the past 15 years, plus a first performance of "Everything Is Going To Be Alright" – words by Derek Mahon set to music by Jonathan Baker.

Music composed by Helen Chadwick, Jonathan Baker, Gwilym Simcock, Andy Sheppard, Karen Wimhurst, Orlando Gough and Barbara Thompson. Music performed by Andy Sheppard (Soprano and Alto Saxophone), Adrian Lever (Piano, Organ), Donna-Marie Landowski (Percussion), Iain Lowery (Guitar). The Voice Project Quintet were Lisa Cassidy (Soprano), Sharon Durant (Soprano), Siân Croose (Alto), Jeremy Avis (Tenor), Jonathan Baker (Bass). Lighting design was done by Tim Tracey. The Voice Project Choir was conducted by Siân Croose.

Nocturne (Songs for a Winters Night)
This piece was performed on 9 February 2019 in St. Mary's Church, Bungay. For the most part, it was a reprise of The Sky is Full of Light, with some changes due to the unavailability of Andy Sheppard. It was performed in candlelight to a full house.

Music composed by Helen Chadwick, Jonathan Baker, Karen Wimhurst, Orlando Gough and Barbara Thompson. Music performed by Adrian Lever (Piano, Organ). The Voice Project Quartet were Lisa Cassidy (Soprano), Siân Croose (Alto), Jeremy Avis (Tenor), Jonathan Baker (Bass). Lighting design was done by Tim Tracey. The Voice Project Choir was conducted by Siân Croose.

I Reach Right Up to the Sun 
This piece was performed on 6 July 2019 at Houghton Hall. It was a promenade performance in the grounds of the Palladian house built in the 1720s for Britain's first Prime Minister, at a time when they were hosting a year-long exhibition (Nature and Inspiration) of works by Henry Moore, James Turrell (the Skyspace), Richard Long (the Earth Sky pieces) and Rachel Whiteread.

Music composed by Helen Chadwick, Jonathan Baker, Karen Wimhurst and Jonathan Baker. The Voice Project Quartet were Lisa Cassidy (Soprano), Sianed Jones (Soprano), Siân Croose (Alto), Jeremy Avis (Tenor), Jonathan Baker (Bass). The Voice Project Choir was conducted by Siân Croose.

And is This a Dream? 
This is the first project to be developed with both the Norwich and Brighton choirs concurrently, in Autumn 2019. It was performed on 16 November 2019 at All Saints Church in Hove (two performances, total audience around 300), and 30 November 2019 at St. Mary's Works in Norwich (three performances, total audience around 300). The two venues were quite different in nature - All Saints being a late Victorian gothic revival building that had been the parish church of Hove since 1892 and St. Mary's Works being a former shoe factory which has been empty since 1972 but is the subject of ambitious development plans.

There were sixteen songs, each one of which depicted a dreamscape. The audience were taken on a journey through buildings that have been inhabited by others for over a century, evoking the half-lit, liminal world of dreaming. The title ‘…And is This a Dream?’ is inspired by The Birds of East London by the poet Stephen Watts, a long-term Voice Project collaborator.

Music composed by Helen Chadwick, Orlando Gough and Jonathan Baker. Music performed by Adrian Lever (Piano, Hammered Dulcimer) and Steve Morgan (Vibraphone - only in Hove). The Voice Project Quintet were Lisa Cassidy (Soprano), Sianed Jones (Soprano), Siân Croose (Alto), Jeremy Avis (Tenor) and Jonathan Baker (Bass). Lighting design was done by Nathan Clarke. The Voice Project Choir was conducted by Siân Croose.

Arc of the Sky (Film) 
Plans to develop a new show for Spring/Summer 2020, inspired by the idea of a bird's-eye view of Holy Trinity Church in Blythburgh, had to be adapted as a result of the Covid-19 pandemic. The original intention had been to perform in the Church (known as the Cathedral of the Marshes) in July 2020. Since singing together in person was impossible, the project was re-designed as a film that was premiered on 2 October at St. Mary's Works in Norwich. The film explores themes of flight, perspective, scale, solitude and connection; and was made by filmmaker Nathan Clarke, with Art Direction from Sal Pittman, including footage contributed by choir members over the course of the project. A prologue to the film was also produced, consisting of images contributed by the choir and instrumental versions of some of the songs.

Music composed by Jon Baker, Orlando Gough and Sian Croose. Based on texts written by British and American poets including Esther Morgan, Emily Dickson, Steven Watts, Wendell Berry, Jane Draycott and George Szirtes. The Voice Project Quintet were Lisa Cassidy (Soprano), Sianed Jones (Soprano), Siân Croose (Alto), Jeremy Avis (Tenor) and Jonathan Baker (Bass). Music performed by Adrian Lever (Piano, Hammered Dulcimer) and Caroline Bishop (Violin).

The Distance Between Us (Film) 
With Covid-19 restrictions still in place in Autumn / Winter 2020, a fully-online project called 'The Distance Between Us' was conceived. This was the second instalment of the trilogy that started with Arc of the Sky. As with Arc of the Sky, a film was made by Nathan Clarke, with art direction from Sal Pittman. Esther Morgan ran creative writing sessions and dancer and choreographer Dane Hurst ran movement sessions. The film was premiered at Norwich Arts Centre on 27 October 2021, before being made available on YouTube.

Music composed by Jonathan Baker, Sian Croose and Orlando Gough.

The Recording Choir (CD) 
In Autumn 2021, it was still not appropriate for choirs to rehearse in person. Instead, the choir continued to meet online, and a CD was created of some of the highlights of recent years.

Arc of the Sky (Live) 
With the relaxation of Covid-19 restrictions in Spring 2022, it was possible to plan to perform Arc of the Sky, as per the original intent. It was performed on 11 June 2022 at St. Andrew's Church, Alfriston (Sussex) and 2 July 2022 at Holy Trinity Church, Blythburgh (Suffolk).

Music composed by Jon Baker, Orlando Gough and Sian Croose. Based on texts written by British and American poets including Esther Morgan, Emily Dickson, Steven Watts, Wendell Berry, Jane Draycott and George Szirtes. The Voice Project Quintet were Lisa Cassidy (Soprano), Sharon Dunant (Soprano), Siân Croose (Alto), Jeremy Avis (Tenor) and Jonathan Baker (Bass). Music performed by Adrian Lever (Piano, Hammered Dulcimer) and Rowland Sutherland (Flute, Piccolo).

Workshops
The Voice Project run a variety of courses as part of an open-access education programme, called 'Open Voices'. These are run between performance seasons:

 Singing from Scratch
 Reading Music for Singers
 Men's Voices
Women's Voices
 Tuning In - music and mindfulness
 Harmony Singing
 Creative Voices - improvisation
 Voice Project Intensives - masterclasses, with one-to-one time.

Arts Council support 
The Voice Project received two grants from Arts Council England's Cultural Recovery Fund during the Covid-19 pandemic to enable it to carry on running projects and courses.

References

External links 
Voice Project:
Voice Project - homepage
Voice Project - reviews: reviews of Travels in Light, The Arms of Sleep, Nocturne, Recording Angel
Voice Project - gallery: images from recent performances
Bandcamp: music samples

Commissioning Festivals:
 Norfolk and Norwich Festival
 Brighton Festival

Venues:

All Saints Church, Hove
Assembly House, Norwich
Firle Place, Lewes
Friends Meeting House, Norwich
Holkham Hall
Houghton Hall
Norwich (Anglican) Cathedral
Norwich (Catholic) Cathedral
Queen Elizabeth Hall, South Bank
Sage Gateshead
Sainsbury Centre for Visual Arts
St. Andrew's Hall, Norwich
St. Mary's Church, Bungay
St. Mary's Works, Norwich
Holy Trinity Church, Blythburgh
St. Andrew's Church, Alfriston

Others:

2013 Norfolk Arts Awards Winners
2014 Norfolk Arts Awards Winners

English choirs